Colin Rigby is a Scottish former rugby union player and referee. He is the 130th President of the Scottish Rugby Union; the 129th person to hold the office.

Rugby Union career

Amateur career

Rigby played rugby at school. He went to Stewart's Melville College. At the age of 21 an injury ended his playing career and he moved into refereeing the game.

Administrative career

He became a President of Stewart's Melville from 2012 to 2015.

He became a chairman and director of the club from 2015 to 2018.

He was elected onto the Scottish Rugby Union council in 2017. He had three years on the SRU board from 2017 to 2020.

He was voted a vice-president of the Scottish Rugby Union in 2020.

Rigby became the 130th President of the Scottish Rugby Union in 2022. His term in office is scheduled to be from 2022 to 2024.

He is the third SRU President to be elected from Stewarts Melville, the other 2 Presidents being Fred McLeod and Lex Govan.

Rigby put in place a new governing structure for the SRU in 2022. He hailed it as a 'significant milestone'.

Business career

Rigby started in finance with Motorola, CTS Automotive, and Basilica Computing. He then moved into Operations and became first a director then Sales director of various companies. He is currently employed as an Account Development Manager at Civica.

References

Living people
Scottish rugby union players
Presidents of the Scottish Rugby Union
Year of birth missing (living people)